John Lanigan (17 June 1912 - October 1988) was an Irish  hurler. His league and championship career with the Tipperary senior team lasted five seasons from 1936 to 1940.

Born in Rossmore, County Tipperary, Lanigan enjoyed his first hurling successes with Thurles CBS. Here he won a Harty Cup medal. Lanigan first appeared for the Thurles Sarsfields club at juvenile and underage levels. He eventually joined the club's senior team winning four county championship medals.

Lanigan made his debut on the inter-county scene when he was selected for the Tipperary minor team in 1929. He enjoyed two championship seasons with the minor team, culminating with the winning of an All-Ireland medal in 1930. Lanigan was added to the Tipperary senior team for the 1936 championship and was a member of the team for the following five seasons.

In retirement from playing, Lanigan became involved in team management and coaching. As manager and selector with the Thurles Sarsfields senior team he helped the team to win ten county championship medals between 1955 and 1965. Lanigan was an All-Ireland-winning selector with the Tipperary senior team in 1971.

References

1912 births
1988 deaths
Thurles Sarsfields hurlers
Tipperary inter-county hurlers
Hurling selectors
Hurling managers